Jóan Símun Edmundsson (born 26 July 1991) is a Faroese professional footballer who plays for Belgian club Beveren and the Faroe Islands national team.

Club career

B68 Toftir
Edmundsson started his career with B68 Toftir.

Newcastle United
In December 2009, Edmundsson joined Newcastle United on loan until the end of the season, with a view to a permanent deal, after a successful trial during a reserve friendly against Hibernian. He signed a permanent deal in June as a hot prospect for the future. He made his first team debut for Newcastle in a friendly against Norwich City on 25 July 2010.

On 7 January 2011, Edmundsson joined Gateshead on a 28-day loan. He made his Gateshead debut on 8 January 2011 against Kidderminster Harriers. He scored his first goal for Gateshead on 15 January 2011 in the FA Trophy in a 6–0 win against Hampton & Richmond Borough.

He featured regularly for the reserves between 2010–12, however he failed to reach first team football for Newcastle.

Viking and return to Faroe Islands
Edmundsson signed for Viking Stavanger on 15 February 2012.

Following his stint at Viking he returned to the Faroe Islands playing for AB and HB.

Vejle and OB in Denmark
In December 2014 Edmundsson signed a two-year contract with Vejle Boldklub.

In January 2016 Edmundsson signed a 2.5-year contract with Danish Superliga club Odense Boldklub.

On 28 November 2015, Edmundsson scored what Danish TV3+ commentators later dubbed as "The Goal of the Century" in Danish football, and made comparisons with high-profile players such as Lionel Messi, George Best and Diego Maradona. In a 1–3 loss against Silkeborg IF in the Danish 1st Division, Edmundsson shook off most of the Silkeborg midfielders, and danced through the middle into the box, evading three more challenges, before hitting a placed shot in the back of the net.

In December 2015, Edmundsson won the TV3+ "Best Goal of the Year award", beating notable players such as Neymar and Lionel Messi.

Arminia Bielefeld
In May 2018, it was announced Edmundsson would join 2. Bundesliga side Arminia Bielefeld from Odense BK for the 2018–19 season having agreed a contract until summer 2020. On 6 August 2018, Edmundsson became the first Faroese goalscorer in German professional football when he scored in his debut against FC Heidenheim.

On 26 September 2020, Edmundsson made his debut in the Bundesliga against 1. FC Köln. Having come from the bench for Sergio Córdova in the second half, he scored the winning goal, becoming the first Faroese to ever play and score in the Bundesliga.

On 30 June 2021, Edmundsson was released by Arminia Bielefeld after reaching the end of his contract.

Beveren
On 26 June 2021, he joined Belgian side Beveren.

International career
Edmundsson was capped at under-19, under-21, during which he scored a memorable goal in a shock 1–0 win over Russia, and full international level while playing in his homeland, making his debut against France in August 2009. He scored his first senior goal in the 2–1 defeat to Estonia on 11 August 2010, this was the first goal of the UEFA Euro 2012 qualifying.

On 14 November 2014, he scored the only goal of the game to defeat Greece in Piraeus, the Faroes' first competitive victory since June 2011.

Career statistics

Club

International

Scores and results list Faroe Islands' goal tally first, score column indicates score after each Edmundsson goal.

References

External links
 
 
 

1991 births
Living people
People from Toftir
Faroese footballers
Association football midfielders
Association football forwards
Faroe Islands international footballers
Faroe Islands under-21 international footballers
Faroe Islands youth international footballers
B68 Toftir players
Newcastle United F.C. players
Gateshead F.C. players
Viking FK players
FC Fredericia players
Argja Bóltfelag players
Havnar Bóltfelag players
Vejle Boldklub players
Odense Boldklub players
Arminia Bielefeld players
S.K. Beveren players
Faroe Islands Premier League players
National League (English football) players
Eliteserien players
Danish 1st Division players
Danish Superliga players
Bundesliga players
2. Bundesliga players
Faroese expatriate footballers
Faroese expatriate sportspeople in England
Expatriate footballers in England
Faroese expatriate sportspeople in Norway
Expatriate footballers in Norway
Faroese expatriate sportspeople in Germany
Expatriate footballers in Germany
Faroese expatriate sportspeople in Belgium
Expatriate footballers in Belgium